The Richmond Globe is a weekly newspaper in Richmond, California, published by The Globe Newspaper Group.

See also
 Richmond Post

External links
 Richmond Globe Official Website

Mass media in Richmond, California
Newspapers published in the San Francisco Bay Area
Weekly newspapers published in California